Trichocorixa is a genus of water boatmen in the family Corixidae. There are about 14 described species in Trichocorixa.

Species
These 14 species belong to the genus Trichocorixa:

 Trichocorixa arizonensis Sailer, 1948
 Trichocorixa beebei Sailer
 Trichocorixa borealis Sailer, 1948
 Trichocorixa calva (Say, 1832)
 Trichocorixa confusa
 Trichocorixa kanza Sailer, 1948
 Trichocorixa louisianae Jaczewski, 1931
 Trichocorixa macroceps (Kirkaldy, 1908)
 Trichocorixa mendozana Jaczewski
 Trichocorixa minima (Abbott, 1913)
 Trichocorixa reticulata (Guérin-Méneville, 1857)
 Trichocorixa sexcincta (Champion, 1901)
 Trichocorixa uhleri Sailer, 1948
 Trichocorixa verticalis (Fieber, 1851)

References

Further reading

 

Articles created by Qbugbot
Corixini
Heteroptera genera